Pitcairn may refer to:


Places
 Pitcairn Islands, in the South Pacific
Pitcairn Island, the only inhabited island of the Pitcairn Islands
 Pitcairn, New York, United States, a town
 Pitcairn, Pennsylvania, United States, a borough

People
 Pitcairn (surname), a list of people
 Frank Pitcairn, penname of British journalist Claud Cockburn (1904–1981)

Other uses
 HMS Pitcairn (K589), a British frigate
 Pitcairn (schooner), a schooner launched in 1890 that sailed in the South Pacific
 Pitcairn Aircraft Company, an American mail plane and autogyro manufacturer
 Pitcairn (horse) (1971–2004), a Thoroughbred racehorse
 Pitcairn (play), a 2014 play by Richard Bean about the Mutiny on the Bounty

See also
 Pitcairn Building, Philadelphia, Pennsylvania, United States, on the National Register of Historic Places